Sir Edward Norreys (or Norris) (died 1603) was a 16th-century Governor of Ostend and English Member of Parliament.

Norreys was the third son of Henry Norris, 1st Baron Norreys and his wife, Lady Margery Williams, then of Wytham in Berkshire (now Oxfordshire). He was elected as Member of Parliament for Abingdon in the Parliaments of 1584–1585 and 1588–1589. Like his more famous brother, Sir John Norreys, Edward became a distinguished soldier, fighting in the Netherlands. He was knighted by the Earl of Leicester in 1586 and was appointed Governor of Ostend in 1590. In February the following year he raided the Spanish fort at Blankenberge and destroyed it, returning to Ostend with little loss.

In England, Sir Edward lived on a small estate at Englefield in Berkshire. Dudley Carleton was his secretary. 

Sir Edward married Elizabeth Norreys in 1600, but the cousinly union did not produce any children. He died in October 1603. Thomas Edmondes wrote that Norreys died after a quarrel with his wife left his mind unbalanced. She subsequently married the Scottish courtier Sir Thomas Erskine.

References

 
 Robert H O'Byrne (1948). The Representative History of Great Britain and Ireland, Part II - Berkshire. London: John Ollivier.

1603 deaths
English knights
English soldiers
People from Englefield, Berkshire
Year of birth unknown
Edward
16th-century English soldiers
17th-century English soldiers
16th-century births
English MPs 1584–1585
English MPs 1589
Younger sons of barons